The Olympic Games is a major international multi-sport event. During its history, there have been full boycotts on six occasions, all of them at Summer Olympics: the first boycott occurred at the 1956 Summer Olympics, with the most recent being at the 1988 Summer Olympics.

South Africa were not invited to the 1964 Games, while its invitation to the 1968 Games was withdrawn after several other African countries threatened to boycott the Games due to apartheid. South Africa would not be permitted to return to the Olympics until 1992.

Rhodesia was also prevented from entering the 1972 Summer Olympics when its invitation was withdrawn by the International Olympic Committee following protests by other African countries.

Possibly the most famous Olympic boycotts occurred in 1980 and 1984, due to the Soviet war in Afghanistan.

In 2021, several nations announced a diplomatic boycott of the 2022 Winter Olympics to protest against Chinese mistreatment of the Uyghur population, thus prohibiting many government officials from attending the games in an official capacity, while still permitting athletes to compete.
Later, India joined the boycott over China's decision to choose Qi Fabao, a regimental commander in the People's Liberation Army, as a torchbearer for the event.

List of full boycotts of an Olympic Games or full non-attendance

List of COVID-19 pandemic non-attendance of government officials or diplomatic boycotts of the Olympic Games
 Countries that due to COVID-19 concerns or diplomatic boycotts did not send official delegations to the Games, however athletes were permitted to participate.

Note: During the 2014 Winter Paralympics in Russia, due to Russia's annexation of Crimea and the violation of the Olympic Truce, the United States and United Kingdom diplomatically boycotted the event, and the entire Ukrainian delegation except for their flagbearer boycotted the opening ceremony.

References 

Olympic Game boycotts
Olympic Game boycotts